Willem Ormea (1611–1673) was a Dutch Golden Age painter known for his still lifes of subjects such as fish.

Life
Willem was the son of the painter Marcus Ormea and Johanna van Gladbeck. He was born in Utrecht in 1611, and probably learnt the art of painting from his father.
He was active in Utrecht between 1634 and 1673, surviving works dating from 1634 to 1658. In 1638, he gave the Hospital of St. Hiob a painting of various types of fish. He was a member of the Guild of St. Luke in 1665. He married Johanna van Veen.

His paintings were mainly of animals, marine and still lifes with fish, sometimes in harbours. Together with his father, he is considered the founder of the still life movement in Utrecht. He collaborated with Adam Willaerts and was influenced by JB Wijtvelt. He had Jacob Gillig as a pupil.

Works

References

Sources

External links

 Willem Ormea in the Rijksmuseum, Amsterdam
 Willem Ormea on Artnet

1611 births
1673 deaths
Dutch Golden Age painters
Dutch male painters
Dutch still life painters
Dutch marine artists
Fish in art
Artists from Utrecht